Isidro Miguel Pitta Saldivar (born 14 August 1999) is a Paraguayan footballer who plays as a forward for Campeonato Brasileiro Série A club Cuiabá.

Club career

Early career
Born in Asunción, Pitta was formed at the Cerro Porteño youth academy from 2013 to 2017, where he was leading goal scorer for its teams. His playing style at Cerro Porteño was an area-man.

Alvarenga
Pitta briefly played for Portuguese club Alvarenga in Arouca for six months during the 2017-18 season, where he scored 5 goals in 14 matches. Upon returning to Paraguay from Portugal, Pitta trialed for Primera División Paraguaya club Guaraní.

Deportivo Santani
In 2019, Pitta signed a two year contract with Deportivo Santaní. Whilst at Deportivo Santani, Pitta was represented by Juan Dragotto.

In March 2019, Pitta debuted and scored in the same game for Deportivo Santaní against Olimpia Asunción. He entered the pitch at the 13th minute of the first half, then scored his goal in the second half of a game which ended in a 2-2 draw.

Amongst other clubs in Paraguay, Argentina and Chile, Universidad de Chile were interested in Pitta during 2019.

In December 2019, Paraguayan Periodic HOY announced that Pitta would join Sportivo Luqueño for the 2020 season and had departed Deportivo Santani, who descended to the country's second-tier.

Sportivo Luqueño
In August 2020, Pitta was in the interest of Argentine club Union de Santa Fé after scoring three goals in three games following the recommencement of the 2020 season. In September 2020, Tigo Sports announced that Pitta was in the orbit of Primera División Argentina club Independiente. Independiente unsuccessfully submitted a loan offer for Pitta with an option to buy him.

Olimpia
In September 2020, Pitta joined Club Olimpia of Asunción from Sportivo Luqueño for the remainder of the 2020 season and the 2020 Copa Libertadores group stage. Prior to the transfer, Pitta had scored 8 goals and created 4 assists in 18 league games for Sportivo Luqueño during the 2020 season.

Huesca
On 16 August 2021, Pitta moved to Spain and signed a four-year contract with Segunda División side SD Huesca. He scored his first goals abroad on 24 September, netting a brace in a 2–0 away win over Real Sociedad B.

Loan to Juventude
On 28 January 2022, Pitta switched teams and countries again after signing a one-year loan deal with Campeonato Brasileiro Série A side Juventude. He has been a regular starter for the club, but his was relegates at the end of the season.

Cuiabá
On 21 December 2022, Pitta signed a four-year contract with Cuiabá, another Campeonato Brasileiro Série A club.

Personal life
Pitta's appearance is likened to Ragnar Lodbrok from the successful series Vikings. He is nicknamed Viking and he celebrates his goals with the same celebration as Conor McGregor.

Career statistics

References

External links

1999 births
Living people
Sportspeople from Asunción
Paraguayan footballers
Association football forwards
Paraguayan Primera División players
Deportivo Santaní players
Sportivo Luqueño players
Club Olimpia footballers
Segunda División players
SD Huesca footballers
Campeonato Brasileiro Série A players
Esporte Clube Juventude players
Cuiabá Esporte Clube players
Paraguayan expatriate footballers
Paraguayan expatriate sportspeople in Portugal
Paraguayan expatriate sportspeople in Spain
Paraguayan expatriate sportspeople in Brazil
Expatriate footballers in Portugal
Expatriate footballers in Spain
Expatriate footballers in Brazil